VNS is an initialism for:

Telecommunications
Victim Notification System, an automated system that notifies a victim that the perpetrator of a crime that affected them has been released
Virtual Network Switching, a technique in telecommunications used to reduce or eliminate the number of data segments used in a command
Virtual Network System, a network that connects all virtual machines and devices regardless of location
Visual Navigation System
Voice Network Switching

Science
Vagus nerve stimulation, a medical treatment used for certain types of epilepsy
Vicarious nucleophilic substitution, a special type of nucleophilic aromatic substitution
Visiting Nurse Service, an in-home medical care service

Other
Valley New School, a charter school in Appleton, Wisconsin, USA
Varanasi, a city in northern India
The IATA code of Varanasi Airport, Varanasi, India
Variable Neighborhood Search
Viet Nam News, English-language newspaper in Vietnam
Viqarunnisa Noon School, an all-girls higher secondary school in Dhaka, Bangladesh
Visual Nature Studio, a Microsoft Windows program used to create photorealistic images
Government of National Salvation (Vlada narodnog spasa), the colloquial name for the collaborationist puppet government in Serbia between 1941-1944
Vlach National Party (Vlaška narodna stranka), a political party in Serbia
VNS Matrix, Australian artist collective
Voter News Service, a defunct American exit poll consortium